Fire & Rain is the second album by Eden, released on April 3, 1995 through Projekt Records.

Track listing

Personnel 
Eden
Peter Barrett – drums, percussion
Sean Bowley – vocals, guitar, tambura, handbell, production
Paul Machliss – Mellotron, hammond organ
Ewan McArthur – bass guitar
Production and additional personnel
Don Bartley – mastering
Garth Booth – photography
Adam Calaitzis – sampler, production, engineering, mixing
Tracy Ellerton – guitar
Renato Gallina – design
Hide Shibata – art direction, photography, design

References

External links 
 

1995 albums
Eden (Australian band) albums
Projekt Records albums